Charles White was the mayor of San Jose, California from 1851 to 1854.

References 

Mayors of San Jose, California
Year of birth missing
Year of death missing